Hiram Cure Airport or Hiram Cure Airfield
 is a public-use airport located two nautical miles (3.7 km) northeast of the central business district of Sunfield, in Eaton County, Michigan, United States. The airport is accessible by road from Eaton Hwy, and is located approximately 1 mile north of M-43.

Facilities
It has one runway designated 9/27 with a turf surface measuring 2,314 by 100 feet (705 x 30 m). For the 12-month period ending December 31, 2005, the airport had 306 general aviation aircraft operations, an average of 25 per month. The airport is closed from December through May, and also when snow-covered. It is attended intermittently.

References

External links 
 Aerial image as of 23 April 1998 from USGS The National Map

Airports in Michigan
Buildings and structures in Eaton County, Michigan
Transportation in Eaton County, Michigan